John Louis Douglas (born September 6, 1945) is a former American football linebacker who played for the New York Giants of the National Football League (NFL). He was also a member of The Hawaiians of the World Football League. He played college football at the University of Missouri.

Early years
Douglas attended Columbia High School in Columbia, Missouri. He accepted a football scholarship from the University of Missouri, where he played only two seasons of college football because he left to work after his freshman year. 

As a senior linebacker, he was a team co-captain along with quarterback Gary Kombrink and received All-Big Eight honors.

Professional career

Dallas Cowboys
Douglas was selected by the Dallas Cowboys in the fourth round (97th overall) of the 1968 NFL Draft. His rookie season was interrupted when he was called up by the Army Reserve. After serving two years of military service in the Vietnam War (where he was wounded), he returned for training camp in 1970 and was waived on September 14.

New York Giants
He was claimed off waivers by the New York Giants and played mostly on special teams. In 1971, he was named the starter at strong-side linebacker. The next year, he returned to a reserve role. In 1973, he started 10 games.

The Hawaiians
In 1974, he signed with the Hawaiians of the World Football League.

References

External links
Just Sports Stats

Living people
1945 births
American football linebackers
The Hawaiians players
Hickman High School alumni
Missouri Tigers football players
New York Giants players
Players of American football from Missouri
Sportspeople from Columbia, Missouri